The theatre games tradition is a method of training actors that was developed in the 20th century by practitioners such as Joan Littlewood, Viola Spolin, Paul Sills, Clive Barker, Keith Johnstone, Jerzy Grotowski and Augusto Boal. Theatre games are also commonly used as warm-up exercises for actors before a rehearsal or performance, in the development of improvisational theatre, and as a lateral means to rehearse dramatic material. They are also used in drama therapy to overcome anxiety by simulating scenarios that would be fear-inducing in real life.

See also

 Group-dynamic game
 Theatre of the Oppressed

Theatre
Acting techniques
Improvisational theatre